The Odd Man was a police series produced by Granada Television, running over four series between 1960 and 1963. The character of pompous police Chief Inspector Charles Rose (William Mervyn) at the start of series 3 cemented the show's popularity, and The Odd Man turned out to be the first in a trilogy lasting most of the 1960s, during which Rose's character slowly developed and became increasingly genial as they progressed.

The Odd Man
This series originally dealt with the investigations of theatrical-agent-cum-detective Steve Gardiner (played by Geoffrey Toone in the first season, replaced by Edwin Richfield thereafter). Gardiner was the "odd man" of the series' title, and his encounters with the police in the form of Chief Inspector Gordon (Moultrie Kelsall) for series 1 and 2. Kelsall was replaced by Chief Inspector Charles Rose (William Mervyn) from series three onwards.  Rose was assisted by Detective Sergeant Macbride (Alan Tilvern) who lasted just the one season. He was replaced by Detective Sergeant Swift (played by Keith Barron) for the final series in 1963.

It's Dark Outside
The characters of Rose and Swift were then given their own series, It's Dark Outside, which ran for two series in 1964 and 1965. The stories were edgy, with Barron's character frequently feeling repressed and confused by the turn of events, which often had him one step behind his superior's superior approach and attitude. Barron left at the end of series 1, to be replaced by Anthony Ainley in the role of Detective Sergeant Hunter.

Mr Rose
The third and final series in the trilogy was Mr Rose, and saw the title character enjoying retirement in Eastbourne. Rose attempted to write his memoirs but found himself being drawn into private detection instead.

The theme tune for Mr Rose was by John Snow, and issued on a single as a cover version by Roy Budd on the Pye Records label in 1967. A separate cover version was recorded on the album Time For TV by Brian Fahey and his Orchestra, on the Studio 2 Stereo label. John Snow's original recording was recorded by the De Wolfe mood music library, and is not commercially available.

External links
 
 
 

ITV television dramas
1960 British television series debuts
1963 British television series endings
1964 British television series debuts
1965 British television series endings
1967 British television series debuts
1968 British television series endings
1960s British crime television series
Black-and-white British television shows
Television shows produced by Granada Television
English-language television shows
East Sussex in fiction